Olimpia Milano history and statistics in FIBA Europe and Euroleague Basketball (company) competitions.

European competitions

Worldwide competitions

Record 
Olimpia Milano has overall, from 1958 (first participation) to 2015-16 (last participation): 338 wins against 207 defeats plus 2 draws in 547 games for all the European club competitions.
 (1st–tier) FIBA European Champions Cup or FIBA European League or FIBA Euroleague or Euroleague: 185–146 (plus 1 draw) in 332 games.
 (2nd–tier) FIBA European Cup Winners' Cup or FIBA Eurocup or FIBA Saporta Cup: 59–33 in 92 games.
 (2nd–tier) ULEB Cup or Eurocup: 15–7 in 22 games.
 (3rd–tier) FIBA Korać Cup: 79–21 (plus 1 draw) in 101 games.

Also Olimpia has a 7 (w) - 3 (d) record in the FIBA Intercontinental Cup or FIBA Club World Cup and a 1 (w) - 3 (d) record in the          McDonald's Championship.

External links
FIBA Europe
EuroLeague
ULEB
EuroCup

Europe